This is a list of the United States Supreme Court cases from volume 374 of the United States Reports:

External links

1963 in United States case law